John Williamson (born August 19, 1986) is an American professional basketball player who last played for Maccabi Kiryat Gat of the Liga Leumit.

College career
Williamson began his college career at Cincinnati State.  Williamson averaged 27.4 points and 11.7 rebounds  leading the school to a 26–9 record, state and regional titles and the finals of the National Junior College Athletic Association Tournament.

Before his junior season he transferred to the University of Cincinnati for his final two years of college.  He was named the team's MVP as based on the following: team leading 7.3 rebounds and was the team's second-leading scorer (13.5).  Williamson finished third in the BIG EAST in offensive rebounding (3.3) and ninth overall.

Professional career
Williamson entered the 2008 NBA Draft but was not selected. On November 6, 2013, he signed with the Nilan Bisons after playing for Fos Ouest Provence Basket. On August 19, 2015, he signed to Hapoel Tel Aviv for the 2015–2016 season after competing for Ironi Nahariya for the 2014–2015 season

On October 24, 2017, Williamson returned to Israel for a second stint, signing with Maccabi Kiryat Gat for the 2017–18 season.

References

1986 births
Living people
American expatriate basketball people in Denmark
American expatriate basketball people in Finland
American expatriate basketball people in France
American expatriate basketball people in Israel
American men's basketball players
Bakken Bears players
Basketball players from Columbus, Ohio
Cincinnati Bearcats men's basketball players
Fos Provence Basket players
Hapoel Tel Aviv B.C. players
Ironi Nahariya players
Junior college men's basketball players in the United States
Maccabi Kiryat Gat B.C. players
Nilan Bisons players
Small forwards